SBS is a national public television network in Australia. Launched on 24 October 1980, it is the responsibility of SBS's television division, and is available nationally.  In 2018, SBS had a 7.7% audience share.

As of 2022, SBS is the lowest-rated television network in Australia, behind the Seven Network, the Nine Network, ABC TV and Network 10.

History

Origins
SBS began test transmissions in April 1979 as SBS Ethnic Television when it showed various foreign language programs on ABV-2 Melbourne and ABN-2 Sydney on Sunday mornings. At the time, SBS was broadcasting on UHF Channel 28 and VHF Channel 0. Bruce Gyngell, who introduced television to Australia back in 1956, was given the task of introducing the first batch of programs on the new station. The first program shown was a documentary on multiculturalism entitled Who Are We? which was hosted, produced and directed by well-known Australian journalist Peter Luck.

When transmission began for the night, the opening announcement would be as follows with "Fanfare for the Common Man" by Aaron Copland playing in the background:"Welcome to Channel 0/28 Multicultural Television, Sydney and Melbourne. A section of the Special Broadcasting Service, transmitting on VHF Channel 0 with a vision carrier frequency of 46.25MHz and on UHF Channel 28 with a vision carrier frequency of 527.25MHz. As well as from the Hyatt Kingsgate Tower in Kings Cross, Sydney, on UHF Channel 54 with a vision carrier frequency of 737.25MHz."

1980s to the 1990s
On 14 October 1983, the service expanded into Canberra on UHF28, Cooma and Goulburn on UHF58 and at the same time changed its name to Network 0–28. Its new slogan was the long-running "Bringing the World Back Home".

On 18 February 1985, the station changed its name to SBS and began daytime transmissions. In June, SBS expanded to Brisbane, Adelaide, Newcastle, Wollongong and the Gold Coast. On 5 January 1986 SBS ceased broadcasting on the VHF0 frequency. Although many Australians at the time did not have UHF antennas, SBS's VHF license had already been extended by a year at this stage and not all antennas had worked well with the low-frequency Channel 0 either. Following this, on 16 March 1986, SBS commenced transmission in Perth, Mount Gambier, Loxton-Renmark, Port Pirie, Broken Hill, Toowoomba, Townsville, Bendigo, Ballarat, Traralgon and Hobart. Darwin was the last capital city to receive the channel, with a local signal launched on 20 May 1994. Other cities that have launched the channel on, between and beyond those days included Maryborough/Wide Bay–Burnett, Rockhampton, Mackay, Katherine, Cairns, Bunbury, Albany, Kalgoorlie, Esperance, Geraldton, Alice Springs, Tennant Creek, Mount Isa, Orange, Griffith, Mildura, Swan Hill, Wagga Wagga, Albury-Wodonga, Coffs Harbour, Lismore, Tamworth and Taree. Shepparton was the last city to launch SBS in the late 1990s.

Although SBS Television commenced transmissions as a non-commercial television network, in 1991 it began accepting and broadcasting television advertisements (a controversial move at the time). These were shown between programs, rather than having them interrupt programs.

2000s
In 2001, digital terrestrial television was introduced with transmissions available to most of SBS Television's coverage area on 1 January 2001, this was soon followed by the gradual introduction of widescreen programming.

The hosts of The Movie Show, David Stratton and Margaret Pomeranz, moved to the ABC in April 2004 to host a new program called At the Movies. The Movie Show continued with four new hosts, which included Megan Spencer, Jaimie Leonarder, Fenella Kernebone and Marc Fennell. The final episode of The Movie Show aired in June 2006, after the show was axed. The same month, SBS announced it would start showing advertisements during programs, unlike the previous practice in which advertisements were only shown in between programs. In 2007, The Movie Show returned with a new interactive ten-minute format, presented by Lisa Hensley and Michael Adams.

On 1 June 2009, SBS TV was renamed SBS One to coincide with the launch of its new sister channel SBS Two, which would carry programming geared towards younger audiences.

2010s
As of 10 December 2013, SBS ceased analogue television broadcasts and is now only available through digital TV or digital set-top box.

On 27 March 2014, SBS and SBS Viceland ended broadcasting Weatherwatch Overnight, an overnight filler program providing national and international weather information with live video feeds of various cities around the world provided by EarthTV, SBS and SBS Viceland is now broadcast 24 hours a day 7 days a week. On 4 July 2015, SBS ONE changed its name back to SBS TV.

SBS launched a new channel focusing on both local and international food programming on 17 November 2015. The channel, called SBS Food (formerly Food Network due to the partnership with Discovery Inc.), is available on free to air channel 33.

On 15 November 2016, SBS rebranded their sister station SBS 2 to SBS Viceland with content from US-Canadian broadcaster Vice Media after signing a deal with Vice Media on 23 June 2016.

On 1 July 2019, SBS World Movies started transmission on Channel 32, replacing the Standard Definition broadcast of Viceland, as Viceland moved to Channel 31 in HD, World Movies became the third multichannel, alongside SBS, Viceland and SBS Food.

2020s 
On 23 May 2022, SBS has launched their own local news in both Arabic and Mandarin on SBS On Demand as they unveiled their fourth multichannel SBS WorldWatch, which would have all the previously aired non-English news bulletins from the World Watch programming block aired alongside. WorldWatch is available on free to air channel 35.

Leading up to the 2022 FIFA World Cup, SBS, spent $20 million in order to acquire the exclusive rights to broadcast the competition.

Programming

SBS is required by charter to meet certain programming obligations. Although it has a strong focus on international news and current affairs, it also presents documentaries and educational programs, drama, comedy, films and sport. SBS devotes a significant part of its morning television schedule to news bulletins in languages other than English as well as showing many subtitled, foreign-language films. Its own news and current affairs aim to have a higher concentration on international affairs than the ABC or the commercial networks. It also shows many documentaries and current-affairs programs, while its sports coverage has a strong focus on international sports.

SBS's drama line-up mostly consists of imported content. International productions shown include Inspector Rex, Unit One, Funland, Shameless, Medici and ZeroZeroZero. Recent locally produced programs have included Kick, or East West 101.

Comedy on SBS has included locally produced shows (SBS Monday comedy slot) but also foreign series such as The Ricky Gervais Show, Skins, Bro' Town, South Park (until 2020), Corner Gas, Nighty Night and Queer as Folk. The channel has presented flagship comedy shows, which include Pizza, Newstopia, Life Support, John Safran, Swift and Shift Couriers, Bogan Pride, in addition to reality television series, Nerds FC, or Song for the Socceroos. As well as this, anime from Japan also aired on SBS, with programs including Neon Genesis Evangelion, Samurai Champloo (as well as shows like Bubblegum Crisis Tokyo 2040 and Bleach in the past) and the Studio Ghibli movies, as well as several cult movies. Dadı, the Turkish version of the American sitcom The Nanny was shown on SBS, as were numerous sitcoms, soap operas, drama series and movies in languages other than English, including Mexican and Brazilian telenovelas and Bollywood movies. Such programming is subtitled in English (such subtitling is typically applied by SBS itself via their inhouse subtitling department), but very little such content is now shown on the station; it has been replaced by largely English-language programming.

The remainder of SBS's schedule consists of English-language lifestyle, music, game and talk shows. These include Iron Chef, RocKwiz, The Movie Show, MythBusters, Top Gear (2005–2009), Global Village, Top Gear Australia, The Food Lovers' Guide to Australia, Food Safari, Remote Area Nurse, Mum's the Word, HELP, Vasili's Garden, Lonely Planet: Six Degrees, Salam Cafe, Inside Australia, Storyline Australia, First Australians, The Nest, My Voice, Oz Concert,  the Eurovision Song Contest. In addition to foreign language film show SBS Film which include the best of international films is also available from The World Movies Channel as aired. Late at night, when there is no scheduled programming, SBS usually broadcasts a weatherwatch program which shows a weather map of Australia. In late 2005, the program was updated to feature weather information from cities around the world, along with a short clip of selected cities.

Since the late 1980s, SBS has screened the 1960s German-made comedy sketch Dinner for One every New Year's Eve, emulating an annual European TV tradition.

Between 1989 and 2006, the narrator for SBS was Robbie McGregor. The current narrator is Lani John Tupu.

News and current affairs

SBS has a range of news and current affairs programming, including its nightly, national, news service SBS World News, investigative programme Dateline, discussion forum Insight, indigenous affairs program Living Black, in addition to its morning & afternoon World Watch timeslot, featuring bulletins in languages other than English. Until early 2007, Toyota World Sport was shown on weeknights until it was axed to accommodate the relaunched, one-hour World News Australia (which is now SBS World News) and World Watch.

It also broadcasts foreign language news on its second digital channel SBS Viceland, sometimes it provides additional information, highlights, and statistics for programmes shown on SBS, such as the FIFA World Cup, The Ashes, Olympic Games, and the Australian Football League Grand Final.

SBS, along with its sister channel Viceland, are still airing English news bulletins from international news channels under the current World Watch block following the launch of SBS WorldWatch multilingual channel.

Sport

SBS Sport currently holds the broadcast rights to a range of sports, which are broadcast on SBS, SBS Viceland and SBS On Demand. They have held the rights to many sporting events over the years, which have included the Tour de France, the World Superbikes, the World Rally Championship, The Ashes, UEFA Champions League, UEFA Cup, FIFA World Cup (every tournament since 1986; shared 2002 tournament with the Nine Network, 2018 with Optus Sport), FIFA Confederations Cup, the FA Cup, the UEFA European Football Championship, the 2004 Summer Olympics, the American National Football League's Super Bowl and the English Premier League. SBS has also produced and broadcast a range of sport related programming including The World Game and the UEFA Champions League Magazine.

The telecast of the 2008 Summer Olympics in Beijing was shared by both the Seven Network and SBS, with the Seven Network holding exclusive Australian free-to-air, pay television, online and mobile telephony broadcast rights. SBS provided complementary coverage and focused on long-form events such as football, road bicycle racing, volleyball, and table tennis. In contrast, Seven broadcast the opening and closing ceremonies and mainstream sports including swimming, athletics, rowing, cycling and gymnastics.

Funding
Approximately 80% of SBS' funding comes from the Australian Federal Government. The rest comes from independent sources, including "advertising and sponsorship, production services and sale of programs and merchandise". In the financial year 2018-19 the broadcaster is slated to receive $272.4 million.

Availability
SBS is available on all of SBS Television's television transmitters in SD Digital. The channel's scheduling differs from state to state only during major sporting events, when the transmission times of other programmes may be altered. During the digital changeover between 2010 and 2013, SBS was also simulcast on Analogue.

In 2010 SBS commenced Trial Broadcasts of the FIFA World Cup in 3D on Channel 40.

SBS HD

The SBS HD multichannel was launched on 14 December 2006. It broadcasts identical programming to SBS, but in 1080i HD via Freeview and Optus D1.

On 8 April 2017, alongside the launch of SBS Viceland HD, SBS HD was upgraded to an MPEG-4 format, replacing the standard MPEG-2 format it had used since its inception.

SBS On Demand
SBS On Demand is a video on demand and catch up TV service run by the Special Broadcasting Service. The service became available on 1 September 2011.

SBS On Demand is available on the web and via apps for mobile devices, smart TVs and set-top boxes.

Logo and identity history
The first SBS logo was a gradiented blue and white globe surrounded by a gradiented blue and white ring. The logo was used across all of SBS's radio and television stations, and symbolised transmission on VHF channel 0. On 14 October 1983, Channel 0/28 was renamed Network 0–28, coinciding with a new logo featuring the new name underneath the globe. On 18 February 1985, Network 0–28 was renamed SBS TV, coinciding with a new logo featuring the letters SBS underneath the globe, however in 1989, the logo was again updated with the globe removed.

A new SBS logo was launched in March 1993, featuring five blue curved splices, described as the "Mercator" logo (named as the shapes look like a mercator globe in 2D), with the letters SBS in white on top. The idents in 1995–2003 usually show the Mercator logo without the letters SBS. The five splices represented the continents of the world and the angle represented the tilt of the Earth's axis.

The new logo and a major revamp was launched on 7 May 2008, reducing the number of splices into four, and shifting the perspective and angle so that each splice is larger than the last. The logo was modified on 1 June 2009 to coincide with the renaming of the channel to "SBS ONE".

On 4 July 2015 SBS launched a modified version of its 2008 logo when its main channel changed its name back to 'SBS TV'. The "SBS ONE" name is still used on electronic program guides.

Identity history
29 April – 22 July 1979: This is SBS, Ethnic Television. (used for SBS TV's test transmissions)
February – May 1980: A Whole New Look at Television.
24 October 1980 – 14 October 1983: Channel 0 – A Whole World of People/Entertainment.
January 1982: Channel 0/28, Celebrating Australia Week 1982.
14 October 1983 – 18 February 1985: Network 0–28 – Bringing the World Back Home.
18 February 1985 – 1986: We're SBS – Bringing the World Back Home.
1986–1988: Discover the Difference.
1989–1996: Bringing the World Back Home.
1998–2004: Your world is an amazing place
2005–2006: Nobody sees the world like SBS
2006–2008: There's more to Summer on SBS.
7 May 2008 – 27 October 2011: Six Billion Stories and Counting.
28 October 2011 – 13 June 2014: Seven Billion Stories and Counting.
14 June 2014 – 3 July 2015: Join In
8 February 2019 – present: A World of Difference

See also

List of digital television channels in Australia

References

External links

Special Broadcasting Service
English-language television stations in Australia
Television channels and stations established in 1980
1980 establishments in Australia